Lasse Juhani Laine (born February 6, 1946 Iitti, Finland) is a Finnish birdwatcher, biologist, and author. He is the author of Suomalainen lintuopas (1996), Suomen luonto-opas (2000) and Lintuharrastajan opas (2004).

Works
 Suomalainen lintuopas, 1996. 
 Suomen luonto-opas, 2000. 
 Lintuharrastajan opas, 2004.
 Sudenpentujen lintukäsikirja, 2005.
 Lasten oma lintukirja, 2007.
 Luonnon lumoissa, 2008.
 Suomen lasten luontokirja (made with Iiris Kalliola), 2010
 Suomen luontovuoden opas, 2010.
 Suomen luonto. Tunnistusopas, 2013. 
 Suomen lasten retkeilyopas (made with Iiris Kalliola), 2014. 
 Suomen linnut – Tunnistusopas, 2015.

References

Finnish ornithologists
Finnish writers
Living people
1946 births